Line 2 of the Madrid Metro is a rapid transit line in Madrid.

History

From 2013-2016, the line was called Línea 2 Vodafone due to a sponsorship by Vodafone.

The  station was temporarily closed in 2019 due for improvements and maintenance.

Rolling stock
Line 2 has used four-car trains of CAF class 3400 since the summer 2007.

Stations

Gallery

See also
 Madrid
 Madrid Metro
 Transport in Madrid
 List of Madrid Metro stations
 List of metro systems

References

External links

  Madrid Metro (official website)
 Schematic map of the Metro network – from the official site 
 Madrid at UrbanRail.net
 ENGLISH User guide, ticket types, airport supplement and timings
 Network map (real-distance)
 Madrid Metro Map

02 (Madrid Metro)
Railway lines opened in 1924
1924 establishments in Spain